One Touch is the debut studio album by British girl group Sugababes. It was released by London Records in the UK on 27 November 2000, and the following month in most other European territories. The trio worked with producer Cameron McVey on the majority of the album, which produced four singles; "Overload", "New Year", "Run for Cover", and "Soul Sound".

Despite initially peaking at number 26 on the UK Albums Chart and being certified Gold by the BPI, and faring even better in German-speaking Europe, where it reached the top ten in Austria, Germany and Switzerland, the sales of One Touch did not meet the record company's expectations, and the group were eventually dropped in Autumn 2001, making it their only release with the label. In addition, it became the only album featuring the group's original line-up, until 2022. Siobhán Donaghy left the group in 2001. She initially stated that she wanted to pursue a fashion career, but was eventually diagnosed with clinical depression amid reports of in-fighting between the Sugababes members.

In a March 2009 interview with Ponystep, group member Mutya Buena revealed that she thinks One Touch is the band's best work and that she still listens to it. Donaghy has also stated in a separate interview that the album had been "ahead of its time". In 2011, the original group members who released One Touch reformed under the new name "Mutya Keisha Siobhan", then resumed performing as the Sugababes after securing the legal rights to the name in 2019.

On 11 May 2021, Sugababes announced that a 20th anniversary edition of One Touch (originally planned for 2020 but delayed due to the COVID-19 pandemic) would be released later that year on 1 October. That same day, they released the MNEK remix of "Run for Cover". Following the album's reissue, it achieved a new peak of number 18 on the UK Albums Chart.

Critical reception

The album received rave reviews, with critics applauding the girls, who were all only 15/16 years old at the time, for writing and singing songs that were considered to be unusually mature for their age. The Guardian called One Touch a "fantastic album that encapsulates the sound of young America with enough style, attitude and originality to mesmerise". Tim Perry from The Independent wrote that "it's about time a half-decent pure-pop album got released, and over a dozen songs that jump playfully between upbeat R&B, poppy soul and groove-laden ballads, these three London schoolgirls have achieved it. What's more, they can actually sing. Listen and weep, Spice Girls: this is the future." Similarly Sunday Mirrors Ian Hyland commented on the album: "All Saints can go off and have their babies. The future of funky British R'n'B is safe." David Brinn from Jerusalem Post noted that "the Sugababes are the latest contender for the girl-group throne, and the London teen trio's opening shot, One Touch, proves that they're one step ahead of the pack."

Andy Strickland, writing for Yahoo! Music called One Touch "just magnificent. Sugababes sing like angels – angels who've earned their wings listening to TLC and SWV not the Spice Girls." He concluded, "at the risk of giving them the musical equivalent of shin-splints by putting them in the first team too early, this record announces the arrival of potentially one of the most important new groups for many years." Dean Carlson from AllMusic complimented the album and rewarded it with a favourable three and a half out of five stars and wrote: "One Touch is everything a post-Spice Girls teen pop debut should be – discreet, adolescent, and as unstudied as a late-night phone call about boys." Entertainment Ireland found that "although the Sugababes name makes them sound like another slice of pop fluff, these new kids on the R'n'B block are actually much more interesting than that. Their [...] debut album shows a maturity and musical proficiency that many of their peers might envy. Their blend of cool, laid-back soul is distinguished by mature vocals, accomplished arrangements and oblique lyrics."

Commercial performance
On 9 December 2000, One Touch debuted at number 77 in the United Kingdom with sales of 5,510 copies. After numerous weeks of fluctuating on the chart, the album made its final chart appearance on 17 February 2001 at number 76. Two months later, the album re-entered the chart at number 71, and reached its peak position of number 26 two weeks later. One Touch was certified Gold by the British Phonographic Industry, denoting shipments of 100,000 copies of the album. By October 2007, the album had sold approximately 220,000 copies in the UK. As of September 2021, the number of chart sales in the UK stood at 226,000. The album peaked at number 55 in Ireland.

One Touch debuted at number nine in Austria, and peaked at number six the following week for two consecutive weeks. The album managed to remain in the chart for 16 weeks. In Germany, the album peaked at number seven, and spent 19 weeks in the chart. One Touch peaked at number eight for two weeks in Switzerland, where it spent 17 weeks on the chart. In Australia, One Touch debuted at number 86 on 6 August 2001. The album re-entered the chart at number 63 two weeks later, where it peaked. The album achieved more success in New Zealand, where it debuted at number 31 on 19 August 2001, and peaked at number 16 the following week.

On 8 October 2021, One Touch re-entered the UK Albums Chart at number 18 following its 20th anniversary reissue, a new peak.

Singles
The album's first official single, titled "Overload", was released on 11 September 2000, in the UK. The song, produced by Cameron McVey, became the Sugababes' first top ten single in the United Kingdom, peaking at number six. The album also spawned three more top 30 singles: "New Year", "Run for Cover" and "Soul Sound", which peaked at number 12, 13 and 30 respectively. "Run for Cover" also proved to have relative success across Europe, but did not challenge that of "Overload".

Track listing

20 year anniversary edition
The 2021 20 year anniversary edition consists of two discs, the first being a remaster of the original album and its B-sides. The second disc includes new remixes from contemporary producers and previously unreleased alternate versions. 
"Always Be the One" appears on streaming as track 20 on disc 1, but appears as track 1 on disc 2 on the 2CD version. "Little Lady Love" (Original Mix) and "Little Lady Love" (About 2 Remix) have been swapped on both streaming and CD.

Charts

Weekly charts

Year-end charts

Certifications

Release history

References

2000 debut albums
Albums postponed due to the COVID-19 pandemic
Albums produced by Cameron McVey
Sugababes albums